Adriana DeSanctis (born June 18, 1988) is a Canadian figure skater. She has competed three times at the Canadian National Championships, achieving her best result, a 5th-place finish, in 2011 and 2012. She moved to Barrie, Ontario in 2000 and trains at the Mariposa School of Skating.

Programs

Competitive highlights 
GP: Grand Prix; JGP: Junior Grand Prix

References

External links

 
 Unseenskaters.com profile

1988 births
Living people
American emigrants to Canada
American female single skaters
Canadian female single skaters
Sportspeople from Barrie
Sportspeople from Philadelphia